This was the first edition of the event.

Philipp Oswald and Andreas Siljeström won the title, defeating Alessandro Motti and Goran Tošić in the final, 6–3, 6–2.

Seeds

Draw

Draw

References
 Main Draw

Internazionali di Tennis Castel del Monte - Doubles
2013 Doubles
2013 in Italian tennis